The 1973 New York state election was held on November 6, 1973, to elect the Chief Judge of the New York Court of Appeals. Besides, a $3,500,000,000 transit-bond issue was proposed by Governor Nelson A. Rockefeller, and rejected by the voters with 1,593,531 votes For and 2,210,907 votes Against it.

Background
Chief Judge Stanley H. Fuld would reach the constitutional age limit of 70 years at the end of the year.

For the first time since the election of Frank H. Hiscock over Almet F. Jenks in 1916, the election for Chief judge was contested. For almost 60 years, all Chief Judges had been cross-endorsed by the two major parties.

Nominations

Democratic primary
The Democratic State Committee met on March 12. No candidate received a majority, and the three contenders who polled more than 25% of the vote, U.S. District Court for the Eastern District of New York Judge Jack B. Weinstein, Appellate Justice Francis T. Murphy and Supreme Court Justice Irwin R. Brownstein, were designated to run in a primary election for Chief Judge. Trial lawyer Lawrence D. Fuchsberg filed a petition to challenge the designees. The primary was held on June 5. The result was so narrow that the winner was known only after the release of the official result on June 21, Fuchsberg winning by a plurality of 755 votes.

Other parties
The Republicans met on March 7, and nominated Charles D. Breitel.

The Liberals met on March 10, and endorsed the Republican nominee Charles D. Breitel.

The Conservatives nominated Supreme Court Justice James J. Leff, a registered Democrat, for Chief Judge.

Result
The Republican/Liberal candidate was elected.

Notes

Sources
Official result: Metropolitan Briefs; New York Certifies Transit-Bond Vote in NYT on December 13, 1973 (subscription required)

See also
New York state elections
New York City mayoral election, 1973

1973
 
New York